Carlo Hintermann (2 April 1923 – 7 January 1988) was an Italian film, television and stage actor and voice actor. He was sometimes credited as Carlo Hinterman.

Life and career 
Born in Milan into a family of ancient Teutonic origin, Hintermann graduated in law, then he enrolled the Centro Sperimentale di Cinematografia in Rome. Graduated in 1949, the same year he debuted in a secondary role in the Domenico Paolella's short film  Terra amara, then he appeared in a large number of movies and TV-series, even if usually in character roles. He was also active on stage, in which he debuted in 1957 with a series of monologues that earned him a writing by Vittorio Gassman for Irma la Douce and later for O Cesare o nessuno; notably, he got a personal success with the recital Milanin Milanon, alongside Milly Monti. He died  due to an accident, run over by a car, in Acireale,a few hours after a theatrical performance in Catania.

Selected filmography 

 My Beautiful Daughter (1950) - Livio Toschi
 Abbiamo vinto! (1951)
 Shadows on the Grand Canal (1951)
 Brothers of Italy (1952)
 Giovinezza (1952)
 Half a Century of Song (1952)
 La cieca di Sorrento (1953)
 Il viale della speranza (1953) – The Swiss Producer
 Cronaca di un delitto (1953) – Giorgio Stoppani
 Traviata '53 (1953) – Gianpaolo
 Mamma perdonami! (1953)
 Mid-Century Loves (1954) – (segment "Dopoguerra 1920")
 Gran varietà (1954) – il barone Arneta (episodio 'Fregoli')
 Violenza sul lago (1954) – Sergio
 Attila (1954) – Capo della tribu
 Pirate of the Half Moon (1957) – Il ticinese
 The Mighty Crusaders (1957) – Dilone
 Rascel-Fifì (1957) – Tre Dita
 Rascel Marine (1958) – Marine
 Five Branded Women (1960)
 A Breath of Scandal (1960) – Prince Ruprecht
 Pugni, pupe e marinai (1961)
 Avenger of the Seven Seas (1962) – Errol Robinson
 Women of Devil's Island (1962) – Capt. Duval
 The Captive City (1962) – Sergeant
 Stop Train 349 (1963) – Soviet Officer
 La Cittadella (1964, TV Mini-Series) – Denny
 Operation Atlantis (1965) – Prof. Gunther Reisch
 Secret Agent Super Dragon (1966) – Coleman
 Z7 Operation Rembrandt (1966) – Kosky
 L'estate (1966) – Carlo Ribulzi
 Last Man to Kill (1966) – Manfred Simpson
 Wanted (1967) – Judge Anderson
 Tiffany Memorandum (1967) – The Shadow's Agent with furry collar
 Desert Commandos (1967) – Sgt. Erich Huber
 I barbieri di Sicilia (1967) – Colonnello Von Krauss
 A Black Veil for Lisa (1968) – Mansfeld
 Rangers: attacco ora X (1970) – Colonel Davenport
 El último día de la guerra (1970) – Lt. Mueller
 That Little Difference (1970) – Il professore
 Il sasso in bocca (1970)
 Il segno del comando (1971, TV Mini-Series) – Lester Sullivan
 Roma Bene (1971) – Secondo avvocato di Elena
 Brother Sun, Sister Moon (1972)
 Mean Frank and Crazy Tony (1973) – Manca
 Irene, Irene (1975) – Paolo
 Eyes Behind the Stars (1978) – Air Marshal Thompson
 Tanto va la gatta al lardo... (1978) – Filiberto Amedeo Viro Siloni
 Ridendo e scherzando (1978) – Marito di Susy

References

External links 
 

1923 births
1988 deaths
Italian male film actors
Italian male television actors
Italian male stage actors
Male actors from Milan
20th-century Italian male actors
Road incident deaths in Italy
Centro Sperimentale di Cinematografia alumni